Rodney Coates is an American football wide receiver. He played college football at West Florida where he won the NCAA Division II Football Championship in 2019.

Early life
Coates grew up in Grove Hill, Alabama. He attended Clarke County High School where he was a Two-time all-county selection in football and a three year starter in basketball.

College career
Coates played college football at University of West Florida (UWF) from 2015 to 2021. Although he redshirted in 2015 and sat out the 2018 season, he finished with 93 career catches for 1,376 yards and 15 TD for UWF.

Professional career
After going undrafted in the 2022 NFL draft, Coates signed with the Seattle Seahawks in May 2022.

References

Living people
West Florida Argonauts football players
Year of birth missing (living people)
People from Grove Hill, Alabama